Wireless dating, Widating or Bluedating (from Bluetooth) is a form of dating which makes use of mobile phone and Bluetooth technologies. Subscribers to the service enter details about themselves and about their ideal partner, as they would for other on-line dating services. When their mobile phone comes in the vicinity of that of another subscriber (a radius of about 10 meters) the phones exchange details of the two people. If there is a match, then both users are alerted and can seek each other out and directly chat using Bluetooth (bluechat). Settings can include an option which restricts alerts to subscribers who have a friend in common.

There is an implementation of wireless dating called Serendipity being developed by MIT's Media Lab in Cambridge, Massachusetts (Reported in New Scientist Magazine 20 March 2004.).

In 2022 the app Luvabuzza was released, the first fully functional Bluedating app, based on Bluetooth Low Energy, which is a databurst in milliseconds. The highly complex development was done in cooperation between a Swiss and Indian company and took almost two years.

See also
 Mobile dating
 Piconet, Scatternet
 Toothing
 Face time
 Lovegety
 List of PAN dating software

External links
 A Bluetooth Scatternet Formation Algorithm Ching Law and Kai-Yeung Siu, Massachusetts Institute of Technology

Sexuality and computing
Bluetooth
Geosocial networking